The Montana Deaf and Dumb Asylum is a site on the National Register of Historic Places located in Boulder, Montana.  It was added to the Register on May 10, 1985.

References

Further reading
Trustees for Those Who Come after Us

School buildings on the National Register of Historic Places in Montana
National Register of Historic Places in Jefferson County, Montana
Italianate architecture in Montana
Renaissance Revival architecture in Montana
Buildings and structures completed in 1893
Deaf culture in the United States